is a Japanese manga artist. She is best known for the series Karakuri Odette and Kamisama Kiss, both of which were serialized in Hakusensha's Hana to Yume magazine.

Biography
Suzuki was born on December 6 in Fukuoka Prefecture, Japan. 
Her pen name comes from a character named Julietta Sakamoto from the seinen manga series, Air Master.

Suzuki has a love of cats, koalas, and sharks. According to an interview with Hakusensha, she first started drawing when she was in her second year of elementary school in a sketchbook of Japonica. She has stated that although does not read much, she enjoys works by Junji Ito. Her favorite character is Ashia. Suzuki has mentioned that she finds male characters easier to draw in general.

Career
Suzuki first made her debut by submitting her work,  to Hakusensha's 44th Big Challenge. Her one-shot was later short listed and published in the first August issue of Hana to Yume in 2004. Her second one-shot,  was again submitted, but to the Hana to Yume Mangaka Course, in which she won the Great Effort Award. The one-shot was then serialized in Hana to Yume's 16th issue.

Suzuki then wrote another one-shot,  and it was published in Hana to Yume's special publication, Hana to Yume Plus, which was released on September 15, 2004. In the November issue of Bessatsu Hana to Yume, she had another one-shot, .  was her last one-shot for that year. It appeared in the 24th issue of Hana to Yume.

In 2005, she had yet another one-shot,  in the January issue of Bessatsu Hana to Yume. She then published  in Hana to Yume's February issue. In April,  was also published in the same magazine. Then in June, her first series titled  began to serialize in Hana to Yume. Shortly after Akuma to Dolce, Suzuki started another series,  in Hana to Yume.

In 2007, she had one more one-shot,  for the 14th issue of Hana to Yume. In its January 2008 issue, Karakuri Odette had finally ended its serialization with 35 chapters, compiled into 6 volumes. Not long after Karakuri Odette ended, she started another series,  (called Kamisama Kiss in Viz's English version), in the same magazine.

She attended her first signing event in Animate located at Takashima, Nishi-ku, Yokohama, Kanagawa Prefecture on May 24, 2009.

In 2008, she placed Akuma to Dolce on hiatus.

In 2016, after wrapping up Kamisama Kiss, she began working on a manga titled Tripitaka Torinique.

In 2018, after finishing up Tripitaka Torinique, she began working on a romantic comedy ninja manga titled Ninkoi.

In 2020, after Ninkoi ended, she began working on a manga titled Meitantei Kо̄ko wa Yūutsu.

In 2022, after Meitantei Kо̄ko wa Yūutsu concluded, she began working on a vampire romantic comedy manga titled Oshi ni Amagami.

Works

One-shots
Hoshi ni Naru Hi
My Precious
Ogami-ya Uradaichō
My Bloody Life
Tsubaki Ori
Sakurachiru
Katakoi Akuma-chan
Ura Antique
Asa ga Kuru

Series
Akuma to Dolce
Karakuri Odette
Kamisama Kiss
Tripitaka Toriniku
Mei tantei Kouko wa yuutsu 

Both Kamisama Kiss and Karakuri Odette are licensed for English release, the first by Viz Media and the second by Tokyopop.

Awards
Great Effort – 338th Hana to Yume Mangaka Course for her second submitted work, Asa ga Kuru.
Outstanding Debut – 31st Hakusensha Athena Newcomers' Awards for her second series, Karakuri Odette.

References

Living people
Year of birth missing (living people)
Manga artists from Fukuoka Prefecture
Japanese female comics artists
Women manga artists